Tropes Zoom was a desktop search engine and semantic analysis software from Acetic/Semantic-Knowledge. Originally written by Pierre Molette in 1994 in partnership with University Paris 8, it was the first search engine based on semantic networks to be widely known.

Unlike other search engines, Tropes Zoom suggested that the user replace each identified word with a hypernym. Thus, the search is not carried out directly on the words chosen, but on the totality of their semantic equivalents. It let users group files together by subject, and analyze all the texts dealing with one or several themes within a large collection of documents.

Since 2011, Tropes is available as free software under a variant of BSD license, but Tropes Zoom is not available.

Tropes Zoom features
The Tropes Zoom suite for Microsoft Windows consisted of five components:
 Tropes, a text analysis and semantic classification software.
 Zoom, a semantic search engine.
 An integrated web crawler, to collect Internet content.
 An integrated report writer.
 An optional web module (web repository generator).

Tropes text analysis
Tropes is a semantic analysis software designed to extract relevant information from texts. It uses several analysis tools and techniques including:
 Word-sense disambiguation
 Summarization and text style identification
 Word categorization
 Natural language Ontology manager
 Chronological analysis
 Real-time graphs and hypertext navigation

This software was initially developed in 1994 by Pierre Molette and Agnès Landré on the basis of the work of Rodolphe Ghiglione.

Since June 2013, Tropes V8.4 can export results formatted for Gephi (network analysis and visualization software).

See also
 Desktop search
 List of desktop search engines
 Text mining

References

Further reading 
 R. Ghiglione, G. Minnini & E. Salès. The intralocutor's diatextual frame. Journal of pragmatics, 1995.
 Vander Putten, Jim; Nolen, Amanda L. (2010). Comparing Results from Constant Comparative and Computer Software Methods: A Reflection about Qualitative Data Analysis. Journal of Ethnographic & Qualitative Research, 5(2), 99-112.
 W. Visser & M. Wolff. A cognitive approach to spatial discourse production. Combining manual and automatic analyses of route descriptions. Proceedings of European Science Conference 2003. EuroCognSci03 (pp. 355–360). Osnabrück, Germany, 2003.
 Y. Kodratoff. Knowledge Discovery in Texts: a definition and applications in Foundation of Intelligent Systems, Ras & Skowron (Eds.) LNAI1609, Springer, 1999.
 A.Piolat & R.Bannour. An example of text analysis software (EMOTAIX-Tropes) use: The influence of anxiety on expressive writing Current Psychology Letters, 2009. 
 S. Despres & B. Delforge. Designing medical law ontology from technical texts and core ontology. 12th International Conference on Knowledge Engineering and Knowledge Management,EKAW Ontology and texts Workshop, 2000.

External links
Semantic-Knowledge homepage
Tropes French Website

Desktop search engines
Defunct internet search engines
Semantics